Alucita hofmanni is a moth of the family Alucitidae. It is found on the Bismarck Archipelago.

References

Moths described in 1900
Alucitidae
Moths of Papua New Guinea